The Frankie Howerd Show is a Canadian comedy television series which aired on CBC Television in 1976. Howerd was an established British comic who was placed in a Canadian setting for this series.

Premise
Originally titled Oooh, Canada, Frankie Howerd starred as a Briton living in Toronto who attempted to find work in Canada. He lived in a decrepit Toronto rooming house operated by landlady Mrs. Otterby (Ruth Springford) and her son (Gary Files). Other regular characters were Wally Wheeler (Jack Duffy), a fugitive from alimony, and Denise (Peggy Mahon), a dancer and model who was often the butt of Howerd's lewd jokes.

Scheduling
This half-hour series was broadcast on Thursdays at 9:00 p.m. (Eastern) from 26 February to 8 April 1976 then on Saturdays at 8:30 p.m. from 24 April to 5 June 1976.

References

External links
 
 

CBC Television original programming
1976 Canadian television series debuts
1976 Canadian television series endings
1970s Canadian sitcoms